Jennifer Carroll MacNeill (born 5 September 1980) is an Irish Fine Gael politician who has served as  Minister of State at the Department of Finance since December 2022. She has been a Teachta Dála (TD) for the Dún Laoghaire constituency since the 2020 general election. She has worked as a solicitor and barrister within the public service and also a government special advisor.

Early life
Carroll MacNeill studied Economics and Social Science at Trinity College Dublin, graduating in 2002 with joint honours in Political Science and Business. She later completed a PhD in public policy and Political Science at University College Dublin, with a thesis entitled Institutional Change in Judicial Selection Systems: Ireland in Comparative Perspective, which won the 2015 Basil Chubb Prize for best PhD thesis at an Irish university in 2014.

Political career

Advisor
She was a policy advisor to Frances Fitzgerald from April 2011 until June 2013. She then worked for the then Minister for Justice and Equality Alan Shatter from September 2013 until his resignation in May 2014. She subsequently took a break from politics, not returning until October 2017 when she came to the aid of Minister for Housing, Planning and Local Government Eoghan Murphy, where she advised him on the National Planning Framework and the creation of the Land Development Agency. She worked with Murphy's office until January 2019 when she left to work for a Public Relations firm.

Councillor
In May 2019, she was elected to Dún Laoghaire–Rathdown County Council for the Killiney–Shankill local electoral area, a position she held until her election as a TD in February 2020.

Teachta Dála
In early 2020, MacNeill was selected internally by the Dún Laoghaire branch of Fine Gael to replace Maria Bailey on the ticket for the 2020 general election, following "Swinggate", a controversy revolving around a dubious legal claim made by Bailey that resulted in her subsequent deselection. At the general election in February 2020, she was elected on the 8th count. Frank McNamara was co-opted to Carroll MacNeill's seat on Dún Laoghaire–Rathdown County Council following her election to the Dáil.

In December 2020, 19-year-old Fine Gael member Dylan Hutchinson dropped his campaign for a council seat after being confronted on a Dublin beach by Jennifer Carroll MacNeill about an alleged derogatory social media post he made about a previous TD. Hutchinson was nominated as a candidate to fill a vacancy on Dún Laoghaire–Rathdown County Council after Barry Ward was appointed to the Seanad in April 2020.

In May 2021, MacNeill apologised for delivering a speech on an online event on 8 March hosted by Iranian political-militant organization the Mujahedin-e-Khalq to mark International Women's Day, saying she had been asked by a constituent to attend the event, and was not informed of any connection between the event and the MEK.

As of 2021, Carroll MacNeill was Vice-Chair of the Oireachtas Joint-Committee on Justice, as well as a member of the Joint Committee on the Implementation of the Good Friday Agreement, Committee of Public Accounts and the Special Committee on Covid-19 Response.

In July 2022 Carroll MacNeill criticised the pace of the reform of sex education for primary school students and suggested things were being deliberately "slow-walked". Carroll MacNeill stated "One reason this is so important is that we know that education interventions can make a huge difference to attitudes. We can either drop our kids to school and wonder which of them, 20 years from now, will be the abusers and which will be the abused, like every generation before them. Or we can ask what can we positively, constructively do that gives their generation a real shot at a different set of attitudes and norms in relation to equality and consent and inclusion". 

In December 2022, she was appointed as Minister of State at the Department of Finance with special responsibility for Financial Services, Credit Unions and Insurance following the appointment of Leo Varadkar as Taoiseach.

Political views and profile
Carroll MacNeill has been profiled several times by the Phoenix political magazine, which offers views from an Irish Republican perspective. The Phoenix has suggested that since become a TD in 2020, Carroll MacNeill has been openly positioning herself as a possible future leader of Fine Gael. The Phoenix has described Carroll MacNeill as fiscally conservative and being in favour of means-tested welfare payments as well as low taxes. 

Carroll MacNeill, a political apprentice of Alan Shatter, has expressed pro-Israeli sentiments; In 2022 she re-convened the previously inactive Shatter-founded Friends of Israel group, which acts as a cross-party Oireachtas organisation. Jackie Goodall, the Executive Director of the Ireland-Israel Alliance NGO, has described Carroll MacNeill as "speaking in defence of Israel".

Harassment
In April 2021 Carroll MacNeill appeared on the panel of the news discussion show The Tonight Show on Virgin Media Ireland. During and after the show, a number of comments on Twitter mocked Carroll MacNeill's physical appearance, which prompted Sinn Féin TD David Cullinane to push back and ask on Twitter "Surely you could make a political point without referring to a person’s appearance. Poor form". Carroll MacNeill thanked Cullinane for his intervention.

In 2022 Gerard Culhane of County Limerick was found guilty in Dublin Circuit Criminal Court of sexually harassing Carroll MacNeill, sending her 10 sexually explicit images and 3 sexually explicit videos, between December 2019 and March 2020, which overlapped with her 2020 general election campaign. On Christmas Day 2019 Culhane sent Carroll MacNeill an image of herself in a swimsuit accompanied by the text "You look so sexy Jen. What a great body you have", leading Carroll MacNeill to fear for her safety. Culhane was given a one-year suspended sentence and ordered to stay away from Leinster House as well as to never contact Carroll MacNeill again.

In 2023 it emerged a second man had begun harassing Carroll MacNeill, once again prompting the involvement of the Garda Síochána. In the aftermath, the Gardaí issued general advice to all TDs about their personal safety.

Author
Carroll MacNeill is the author of The Politics of Judicial Selection in Ireland, published in 2016 by the Four Courts Press. Her thesis was given an academic award before being published as a book. David Gwynn Morgan of The Irish Times said of it; "this book by an author of unusual but apt pedigree packs in a lot of new, useful information in a field crying out for it. It is also timely and so is likely to be influential".

Personal life
She is married to former Irish rugby player Hugo MacNeill, the former managing director of Goldman Sachs Investment Banking in Ireland. The couple have one son.

References

External links
Jennifer Carroll MacNeill's page on the Fine Gael website

1980 births
Alumni of Trinity College Dublin
Alumni of University College Dublin
Living people
Local councillors in Dún Laoghaire–Rathdown
Members of the 33rd Dáil
Fine Gael TDs
21st-century women Teachtaí Dála
Rugby union players' wives and girlfriends
Ministers of State of the 33rd Dáil